The Division of Evans was an Australian Electoral Division in New South Wales. 
The division was created in 1949 and abolished in 1977. It was named for George Evans, an early explorer. It was located in the inner western suburbs of Sydney, including Ashfield, Croydon and Drummoyne. It was a marginal seat, held by both the Australian Labor Party and the Liberal Party.

Prior to its abolition in 1977 and except in 1961, Evans was a bellwether seat that was won by the party that formed government afterwards.

Members

Election results

1949 establishments in Australia
Constituencies established in 1949
1977 disestablishments in Australia
Constituencies disestablished in 1977
Evans